RedNation Online is a Canadian online magazine for Canadian soccer news.

The site covers Toronto FC, Vancouver Whitecaps FC, CF Montreal and the men's and women's program. In 2012, the site was awarded Canadian Online Publishing Awards (COPAs) Gold Award for Best online-only publication website.

References

External links
 

Association football magazines
Online magazines published in Canada
Sports magazines published in Canada
Magazines established in 2009
Magazines published in Toronto